The Jim Jefferies Show was an American late-night talk and news satire television program hosted by comedian Jim Jefferies. The show aired Tuesdays on Comedy Central and tackles the week's top stories and most controversial issues. In March 2017, Comedy Central ordered ten half-hour episodes. The series premiered on June 6, 2017, and was later extended with ten additional episodes, which began airing after a five-week hiatus. On January 30, 2019, Comedy Central renewed the show for a third season which premiered on March 19, 2019 and, after a summer hiatus, ran from September 17, 2019 through November 19, 2019 when the show was canceled, ending its three-year run. As of December 2021, seasons 1 and 2 are available to watch on Paramount+.

Background 

Prior to his foray into late night television, Jefferies starred in the comedy series Legit, which ran for two seasons between 2013 and 2014 on FX and FXX. Early in his stand-up career, Jefferies was well known for his off-color humor. In his Netflix special Bare (2014), Jefferies performed a routine on gun control, which was previously used in his stand-up and on Legit. The Bare routine has gone viral, especially after mass shootings in the United States. Jefferies revisited the topic in his Netflix special Freedumb (2016), in which he also criticized then-Republican candidate Donald Trump during the 2016 presidential campaign. Jefferies has since become a commentator, often speaking to newspapers and appearing on television programs to discuss his political opinions.

In late 2016, Comedy Central ordered a pilot for the show, which was taped on December 7. The network picked up the show as a weekly half-hour series in March 2017, with ten episodes set to air in the summer.

Actor Brad Pitt became a fan of Jefferies after seeing clips of his standup, and called him to ask if he could be part of his new show. He was enthusiastic when Jefferies suggested he be the show's weatherman. Pitt, who is only referred to generically as "Jim Jefferies Show Weatherman", is paid the SAG minimum salary of $400 per episode.

Promotion 
In anticipation of the program's premiere, an online presence was launched for The Jim Jefferies Show in May 2017, including social media accounts. Jefferies introduced a fictional goldfish for the family of Donald Trump named Dave, who is dubbed the first goldfish of the United States. In June, Jefferies appeared as a guest on Unmasked, The Daily Show, CBS This Morning, Off Camera and Conan. Jefferies continued performing stand-up gigs in between show tapings and media appearances.

Production 
The Jim Jefferies Show was taped on Tuesdays around 12:00 p.m. Pacific time at Sunset Las Palmas Studios in Hollywood, California. On November 6, 2019, it was announced that the series would conclude on November 19 as Jefferies moved to focus on a put pilot in production for NBC.

Broadcast 

On January 15, 2018, Comedy Central renewed the series for a 20-episode second season, which premiered on March 27, 2018. On September 13, 2018, Comedy Central announced additional new episodes would air beginning September 18, 2018.

In Australia, The Jim Jefferies Show aired Thursdays on Foxtel's Comedy Channel and Fetch TV's Comedy Central Australia.

In Canada, The Jim Jefferies Show aired Tuesdays on The Comedy Network.

In the United Kingdom, The Jim Jefferies Show aired Fridays on Comedy Central UK.

Podcast 
Jefferies co-hosted The Jim Jefferies Show Podcast with his fellow comedian Forrest Shaw, which was released alongside the last ten episodes of the first season and served as an aftershow for the television program. Each podcast features detailed commentary on news and politics, segments featured in the latest television episode, and jokes that were left out of the show. This was the first series of a new podcast network for Comedy Central.

Reception
In a mixed review of the show for The Hollywood Reporter, Daniel Fienberg wrote that "What The Jim Jefferies Show needs is to stop trying to be like the other kids and to start trying to be like Jim Jefferies." Mike Hale of the New York Times also gave the show a mixed review, writing that "As a late-night host, Mr. Jefferies can appear to be doing nothing much, but there’s a tricky balancing act going on between his ordinary-bloke persona and his sometimes savagely raunchy punch lines. The results are hit and miss, and sometimes it’s a long while between hits." However, Hale also praised Jefferies for occasionally delivering "explosive" lines in the show.

The first season ended with Jefferies listed in Variety's "Fresh Voices in TV Who Broke Out in 2017" and the writing team nominated for Best Comedy/Variety Talk Series at the 2018 Writers Guild of America Awards.

Cancellation
On November 6, 2019, Comedy Central announced the show had been canceled, but would air an additional two weeks of the series, with the last show to be broadcast on November 19, 2019.

Episodes

Season 1 (2017)

Season 2 (2018)

Season 3 (2019)

References

External links 

2017 American television series debuts
2019 American television series endings
2010s American late-night television series
2010s American political comedy television series
2010s American satirical television series
2010s American television news shows
American news parodies
Comedy Central late-night programming
Comedy Central original programming
English-language television shows
Political satirical television series